Vianí is a municipality and town of Colombia in the department of Cundinamarca.

External links
 Official website

Municipalities of Cundinamarca Department